Ålfoten is a village in Bremanger Municipality in Vestland county, Norway. The village is located along the Ålfotfjorden, a branch of the main Nordfjorden and has a population of about 200.
  
The village has an elementary school, a grocery store and the Ålfoten Church (built in 1678). Ålfoten has two hydroelectric power stations, Åskåra and Yksneelvane.

Ålfoten is surrounded by mountains. To the south: Høgefjellet, Bukkenibba and Blånibba. To the north: Nakken, Kårnyken, Kvasshornet and Klakegga.

Gallery

Villages in Vestland
Bremanger